Manuela Furlan (born 30 June 1988) is an Italian rugby union player and the captain of the Italy women's national rugby union team. In April 2021, in Italy's match against Scotland in the 2021 Women's Six Nations Championship, Furlan scored a hat-trick.

Furlan was selected in Italy's squad for the 2021 Rugby World Cup in New Zealand.

References

External links
 

1988 births
Living people
Italian female rugby union players
Italy international women's rugby sevens players
Sportspeople from Trieste
Universiade medalists in rugby sevens
Universiade silver medalists for Italy
Medalists at the 2013 Summer Universiade